The canton of La Vallée de l'Orbiel is an administrative division of the Aude department, southern France. It was created at the French canton reorganisation which came into effect in March 2015. Its seat is in Villemoustaussou.

It consists of the following communes:
 
Aragon
Caudebronde
Conques-sur-Orbiel
Fournes-Cabardès
Les Ilhes
Labastide-Esparbairenque
Lastours
Malves-en-Minervois
Les Martys
Mas-Cabardès
Miraval-Cabardes
Pennautier
Pradelles-Cabardès
Roquefère
Salsigne
La Tourette-Cabardès
Ventenac-Cabardès
Villalier
Villanière
Villardonnel
Villegailhenc
Villemoustaussou

References

Cantons of Aude